Jim Frohna is an American cinematographer and director, best known for his work on the ground-breaking, award-winning  Amazon series Transparent and I Love Dick as well as the AppleTV series Shrinking and the Emmy-winning HBO show Big Little Lies.

Early life and education 
Frohna was born and raised in Greendale, Wisconsin. He attended the University of Wisconsin-Madison, then transferred to New York University where he graduated with a Bachelor of Fine Arts from the Tisch School of the Arts.

Career 
Frohna's work as a director of photography is known for conveying a palpable sense of intimacy and for capturing the female gaze. In a 2014 IndieWire interview for Transparent, cast members praised Frohna's approach:"Jim is probably the most intuitive [director of photography] I've ever worked with. He knows before you know where the action is going to go. During this one scene with an argument, he was lying in the floor just covered in sweat afterward. He's not just photographing it, he's experiencing it. He was all but a cast member."Frohna began his career as a commercial cinematographer when he stepped in for director of photography Joaquin Baca Asay on the notable Sony Bravia's Sony Balls commercial for director Nicolai Fuglsig in 2005.

Frohna first collaborated with Joey Soloway as director of photography on the comedy-drama Afternoon-Delight, for which Soloway won the award for Best Director at the 2013 Sundance Film Festival. In addition to Soloway, he has worked as director of photography with over 25 eminent DGA directors, including Andrea Arnold, Mike Mills, Michael Showalter, Zetna Fuentes, James Ponsoldt, Jay Duplass, Peyton Reed, Kimberley Pierce, Davis Guggenheim and Jonathan Dayton & Valerie Faris. From 2014 through 2019, Frohna continued with what became a long, rich collaboration with Soloway, serving as the cinematographer on all 5 seasons of the ground-breaking, Emmy-award winning Amazon series Transparent, starring Jeffrey Tambor, Gaby Hoffmann, Jay Duplass, Amy Landecker and Judith Light, In 2017, Frohna joined Soloway and acclaimed indie director Andrea Arnold on the Amazon series I Love Dick, starring Kevin Bacon and Kathryn Hahn. In 2017 Frohna also served as cinematographer on four episodes of the Showtime series I'm Dying Up Here, starring Melissa Leo, Michael Angarano, and Sebastian Stan.

In addition to cinematography, Frohna served as director for multiple episodes of Transparent, including The Book of Life and I Never Promised You a Promised Land, and of I Love Dick for the episode This Is Not A Love Letter.

In February 2018, Frohna began pre-production with director Andrea Arnold for season 2 of the HBO series Big Little Lies, starring Reese Witherspoon, Nicole Kidman, Zoë Kravitz, and Laura Dern.

Awards and nominations

Filmography

Film

Television

Personal life 
Frohna is married to artist and producer Diana Kunce; they collaborated on the 2018 Sundance Official Selection short Eve with Susan Bay-Nimoy. and the 2019 Sundance Episodic pilot It's Not About Jimmy Keene. They have two children and reside in Los Angeles, CA.

References

External links 
 Jim Frohna Official Site
 

Year of birth unknown
Living people
People from Greendale, Wisconsin
Tisch School of the Arts alumni
University of Wisconsin–Madison alumni
Filmmakers from Wisconsin
American cinematographers
American television directors
Year of birth missing (living people)